Alejandra Usquiano (born 12 May 1993), is a Colombian athlete who competes in compound archery. She won a gold medal at the 2013 Archery World Cup Final, and achieved her highest world ranking of 6 in 2013.

She won the silver medal in the women's compound event at the Antalya, Turkey event in the 2022 Archery World Cup.

References

External links

 

1985 births
Living people
Colombian female archers
World Archery Championships medalists
Central American and Caribbean Games silver medalists for Colombia
Competitors at the 2014 Central American and Caribbean Games
Competitors at the 2018 Central American and Caribbean Games
Central American and Caribbean Games medalists in archery
20th-century Colombian women
21st-century Colombian women
South American Games gold medalists for Colombia
South American Games bronze medalists for Colombia
South American Games medalists in archery
Competitors at the 2022 South American Games